Srimathi Sundaravalli Memorial School is a school located in Perungalathur Chennai. The school follows CBSE standard of education. The school is named after Smt. Sundaravalli, mother of the founder Mr. K. Santhanam.

The school was inaugurated on 11 June 1986 by the educationist the late Kulapathi Dr. Balakrishna Joshi in the presence of Sri Varadha Ethiraja Jeer Swami of Sriperumbudur. It is a co-educational school, with classes from preschool to 12, and is affiliated to the Central Board of Secondary Education, New Delhi.

The school is famous for its logistically sound student transportation system, using almost 100 buses, owned by the school.

The school has trained many students who today work in the Indian Military, hospitals, and the school itself. 

The faculty is well trained and said to have many teachers who hold masters degree which is rare in other Indian Schools

The school trains the students in fine arts: keyboard, vocal, mridangam, veena, photography, bharatanatyam, violin and arts and crafts. There are two periods per week for classes 6 and above. Three periods for classes 3 to 5 of the same per week.

References

Primary schools in Tamil Nadu
High schools and secondary schools in Tamil Nadu
Schools in Chennai
Schools in Kanchipuram district